Pyotr Petrovich Fyodorov (born 21 April 1982) is a Russian actor. He is known for playing the role of Guy Gaal in The Inhabited Island, Gromov in Stalingrad and Yakovlev in The Duelist.

Biography
Pyotr Fedorov was born on 21 April 1982 in Moscow, into a family of actors. His father, Pyotr Evgenievich Fedorov (27 October 1959 - 10 March 1999), was a Soviet and Russian theater and film actor, art critic, television presenter (died of cancer at the age of thirty-nine). Grandfather - Yevgeny Fyodorov (born 3 March 1924 - 30 April 2020), was a Soviet and Russian theatrical actor, "Honored Artist of the RSFSR", artist of the Vakhtangov State Academic Theater (1945 to present).

Pyotr spent his childhood in the Altai, Uimon Valley. He was fond of drawing and wanted to become an artist. The eight-grader moved with his family to Moscow. In 1997, after receiving an incomplete secondary education, he entered the Moscow Theater Art Technical School (MTTU), after which he planned to enter the Stroganov Moscow State University of Arts and Industry, but after his father's death changed his decision and left the school after the second year of training.

In 1999, he entered the acting department of the Boris Shchukin Theatre Institute. In 2003 he graduated from the institute. He played a student Belyaev in the graduation performance "Beautiful People" based on the play of Ivan Turgenev, where actors Grigory Antipenko and Olga Lomonosova were also engaged. In September 2003, the performance "Beautiful People" won the prize of the newspaper Moskovskij Komsomolets as the best performance of the season in the nomination "Beginners".

After graduating from the Theater Institute, he served at the Moscow Stanislavsky Drama Theater.

His first major role in film was of Lyonka in 101 km (2001), directed by Leonid Maryagin. Pyotr received wide popularity when he played Danila in the popular teen television series Club (2006), which became the most successful and rated project in the history of the television channel MTV Russia. After the third season, Pyotr left the project and began preparing for the shooting in the sci-fi film directed by Fyodor Bondarchuk Dark Planet (2008) based on the novel of the same name by Arkady and Boris Strugatsky.

In 2009, Pyotr appeared in one of his most significant projects at that time – Russia 88, a Russian pseudo-documentary film drama directed by Pavel Bardin about the youth subculture of the white power skinheads. It premiered 59th Berlin International Film Festival in the "Panorama" section.

In 2011 Pyotr acted in the film The PyraMMMid directed by Eldar Salavatov. The plot is based on the novel of the same name by Sergei Mavrodi, founder of the pyramid scheme MMM.

Fyodorov played the lead role in the film Stalingrad made in 2013 by director Fyodor Bondarchuk which broke box-office records for Russian films upon its release.

In the successful New Year comedies Yolki 2 (2011) and Yolki 3 (2013), Pyotr Fyodorov played Nikolai Kravchuk.

He played a supporting role in the 2014 film Territory by Aleksandr Melnik, a screen version of the novel of the same name by Oleg Kuvaev, which tells of the discovery of a gold-bearing deposit in the late 1950s of the 20th century.

In 2016, he had lead roles in the adventure-drama The Duelist and the disaster film The Icebreaker.

Filmography

Film

Television

Producer
 Per rectum
 Blood
 Robotrip
 Siberia - Bottomless Vial of Wishes (clip)
 From the Forest by Сlick-Boutique
 RACE TO SPACE - Endless Dream
 RACE TO SPACE - Is This Home (feat.Victor Gorbachev)

References

External links

 

1982 births
Living people
Russian male film actors
Russian male television actors
Russian male stage actors
Male actors from Moscow
21st-century Russian male actors